The Pilbarra Goldfield News was a newspaper published from 19 February 1897 to 20 March 1923, first in Marble Bar and then, from 1912, in Port Hedland, and is considered one of the earliest publications from the Pilbara.
The goldfield located in the Pilbara region was separated into two parts as early as 1896, included mining in Marble Bar, Nullagine, Yandacoogina, and other localities near Marble Bar and Nullagine.

It was regularly quoted by Perth based newspapers such as the Daily News for information about Pilbara matters, as well as commenting and lobbying for the eventual Port Hedland - Marble Bay railway.

Publication details 

Marble Bar, W.A. : Ernest A. Williams, 1897-[1923]

Vol. 1, no. 1 (Feb. 19, 1897)- 
From Aug. 6, 1912 published at Port Hedland, Western Australia

Ceased publication on 20 March 1923.

Notes

References 

Pilbara newspapers
1897 establishments in Australia
1923 disestablishments in Australia
Defunct newspapers published in Western Australia